Hot Tip is a 1935 American comedy film directed by Ray McCarey and James Gleason from a screenplay by Hugh Cummings, Olive Cooper, and Louis Stevens, based on William Slavens McNutt's short story, "Leander Clicks", which had been published in the August 1928 edition of Red Book Magazine.  Gleason also starred in the film, along with ZaSu Pitts, Margaret Callahan, and Russell Gleason (James' son). It was released by RKO Radio Pictures on September 6, 1935.

Plot
Belle McGill is unaware of husband Jimmy's gambling problem. First he loses $100 at the racetrack and vows never to place another wager. Then he persuades future son-in-law Ben to bet on a sure thing, Leadpipe, but gets a tip on another horse just before the race, bets Ben's money on that instead, then watches Leadpipe win.

In danger of losing his business, if not his family, Jimmy delays paying off Ben, who excitedly believes his horse was the winner. Unbenknowst to all, Belle has been making bets of her own. When a horse called Honey Girl comes along, Belle and Jimmy risk everything they have, and they come out winners.

Cast
 ZaSu Pitts as Belle
 James Gleason as Jimmy
 Margaret Callahan as Jane
 Russell Gleason as Ben

References

External links

1935 films
1935 comedy films
American black-and-white films
American comedy films
Films based on short fiction
Films directed by Ray McCarey
American horse racing films
RKO Pictures films
1930s English-language films
1930s American films
English-language comedy films